Saying Something is an album by American jazz trumpeter Bill Hardman which was recorded in 1961 and released on the Savoy label. The 1986 reissue added an additional track from the original sessions

Reception

The AllMusic review by Scott Yanow stated, "The music overall is solid hard bop, very much of the period but still fairly fresh".

Track listing
All compositions by Bill Hardman, except where indicated.
 "Capers" (Tom McIntosh) − 7:10
 "Angel Eyes" (Matt Dennis, Earl Brent) − 5:56
 "Jo B" − 9:52
 "Buckeye Blues" − 10:46
 "Assunta" (Cal Massey) − 6:11
 "It Ain't Happened Yet" − 5:20
 "With Malice Toward None"  (McIntosh, Jon Hendricks) − 3:57 Additional track on reissue

Personnel 
Bill Hardman − trumpet
Sonny Red − alto saxophone (tracks 1-6)
Ronnie Mathews − piano 
Bob Cunningham (tracks 1 & 6), Doug Watkins (tracks 2-5 & 7)  − bass
Jimmy Cobb − drums

References 

1961 albums
Bill Hardman albums
Savoy Records albums
Albums produced by Tom Wilson (record producer)